Ha Tsuen, or Ha Tsuen Heung is an area at the west of Yuen Long Town in Hong Kong. Administratively, it belongs to Yuen Long District.

History
During the Hungwu reign (1368-1398) of the Ming Dynasty, two members of Tang clans in Kam Tin left for Ha Tsuen as they saw the potentials of this place as markets and places of producing fish and salt.
These two members of Tang clans, Tang Hung-wai and Tang Hung-chi, built two villages there. The two villages are Tseung Kong Wai (formerly Sai Tau Lei) and Tung Tau Tsuen (formerly Tung Tau Lei).

The Tang Ancestral Hall, also known as Yau Kung Tong, was constructed by the Tang Clan of Ha Tsuen to commemorate their two founding ancestors, Tang Hung-chi and Tang Hung-wai, for establishing the village settlements in Ha Tsuen. Construction of the Ancestral Hall began in 1749 and was completed in 1750. It is a declared monument.

It was once an important port and market because of the water transport system. There are rivers flowing to Deep Bay; boats from Canton and other places can reach Ha Tsuen.

Villages
Villages in Ha Tsuen include:

 Fung Kong Tsuen
 Ha Pak Nai Tsuen
 Ha Tsuen Shi
 Hong Mei Tsuen
 Lee Uk Tsuen
 Lo Uk Tsuen
 Pak Nai Tsuen
 San Sang Tsuen
 San Uk Tsuen
 San Wai (*)
 Sha Chau Lei
 Sik Kong Tsuen
 Sik Kong Wai (*)
 Tin Sum Tsuen (*)
 Tseung Kong Wai (*)
 Tung Tau Tsuen

(*) Indicates walled villages of Hong Kong

Education
Ha Tsuen is in Primary One Admission (POA) School Net 72. Within the school net are multiple aided schools (operated independently but funded with government money) and one government school: Tin Shui Wai Government Primary School (天水圍官立小學).

See also
 Ling To Monastery
 Mong Tseng Wai
 Sha Kong Wai
 Tsz Tin Tsuen

References

Further reading

External links

 The incredible journey of Yuen Long - Tang Ancestral Hall, Ha Tsuen

 
Yuen Long District
Areas of Hong Kong